Jesper Nohrstedt Boesgaard (born 20 September 1994) is a Danish singer. He made his debut on the Danish X Factor in 2010. Two years later he reached second place in the music contest Dansk Melodi Grand Prix; had he won, he would have represented Denmark in the Eurovision Song Contest 2012. He is currently making music with Danish producer and DJ Morten Hampenberg.

Beginnings
Jesper was born on Amager island, but grew up in Taastrup, near Copenhagen where he lived with his Danish father Carsten, Swedish mother Gudrun and sisters Linn and Fie.

Danish X Factor (2010)
At the age of 16, while a student, he took part in Season 3 of the Danish X Factor in 2010 reaching the Final 3 before being eliminated in the final coming third overall behind Thomas Ring Petersen and runner-up Tine Madsen.

Performances
 Audition: Coldplay – "A Message"
 SuperBootcamp: U2 – "One"
 Bootcamp: The Beatles – "Blackbird" / Coldplay - "Life In Technicolor"
 Live Show 1: Muse – "Uprising"
 Live Show 2: Michael Jackson & Paul McCartney – "Say Say Say"
 Live Show 3: Dúné – "Dry Lips"
 Live Show 4: Owl City – "Fireflies"
 Live Show 5: Duran Duran – "A View to a Kill"
 Live Show 6: Gasolin' – "Kvinde Min" / Coldplay - "Speed of Sound"
 Final: Steppenwolf – "Born To Be Wild",  Dúné - "Let Go Of Your Love" (Duet)

Dansk Melodi Grand Prix (2012)
In 2012, he participated in Dansk Melodi Grand Prix 2012 with the song "Take Our Hearts", written by Mads B. B. Krog, Engelina Larsen and Morten Hampenberg. He reached the Superfinal (final three) with the song at the Dansk Melodi Grand Prix 2012 for a bid to represent Denmark at the Eurovision Song Contest 2012 and finished runner-up behind the winning song "Should've Known Better" by Soluna Samay.

Dansk Melodi Grand Prix Superfinal

Despite not winning in his bid to represent Denmark in the Eurovision Song Contest, Jesper's song proved very popular and charted at #4 immediately after the final.

Discography

Singles

Featured in

References

External links
LastFM

1994 births
Living people
X Factor (Danish TV series) contestants
21st-century Danish male  singers